Dagar som kommer och går is a studio album from Swedish dansband Kikki Danielssons orkester, formerly known as Kikki Danielsson & Roosarna. It was released in 1998.

Track listing

Svensktoppen
The title track "Dagar som kommer och går" (Swedish: "Days who come and pass"), whose theme is to find happiness all the seasons of the year and save the time who gives good memories, failed to enter Svensktoppen.

References 

1998 albums
Roosarna albums